Jamaica Rifle Association was founded in 1896 and is the umbrella organization for sport shooting in Jamaica, being a member of the international organizations:

International Practical Shooting Confederation (IPSC) 
International Confederation of Fullbore Rifle Associations (ICFRA)
International Shooting Sport Federation (ISSF)
World Archery Federation (WAF)

References 

Regions of the International Practical Shooting Confederation
Rifle
Rifle associations
Regions of the International Confederation of Fullbore Rifle Associations